Rohan Spong (born 15 September 1981) is an Australian documentary film director best known for his films All the Way Through Evening and Winter at Westbeth.

Rohan studied film theory and practice at the University of Melbourne. Whilst living in Los Angeles in 2008, Rohan assembled his first feature-length documentary T is for Teacher (2009), about the experiences of four transgender school teachers in American schools. The film screened at a number of international festivals alongside Oscar contenders later that year. It was named by two Australian reviewers as amongst the best films to screen in Australian cinemas in 2009.

In late 2011, Rohan completed the feature documentary All The Way Through Evening, about music composed in New York's East Village amidst the early years of the HIV/AIDS pandemic. The film premiered in New York's East Village on 1 December 2011 (World AIDS Day). Rohan and the film's main subject (elderly concert pianist Mimi Stern-Wolfe) were invited as guests of New York Mayor Michael Bloomberg on World AIDS Day 2011 as part of an annual event held at Gracie Mansion.

All the Way Through Evening opened theatrical to critical acclaim and four-star reviews in Australia on 29 November 2012. Phillipa Hawker of The Age newspaper described the film as: "A graceful story of music and memory", rating the film four stars. Don Groves of SBS marvelled at Spong's ability to single-handedly bring the story to cinema: "Multi-tasking as director, producer, cinematographer and editor, Spong has crafted a handsome-looking production despite working on a frugal budget. It’s an impressive effort" and also gave the film four stars. Richard Watts of Artshub also gave the film four stars and named it amongst his most favourate films of the year, describing it as: "an important film, and a beautiful one.". Australian magazine FilmInk surmised the film as "an incredibly affecting and important piece of cinema".

Despite only expecting to run for a week in each city, the film ran for a total of thirteen weeks at Melbourne's Cinema Nova, outlasting a number of big-budget films including The Hobbit: An Unexpected Journey, Celeste And Jesse Forever and Perks of Being a Wallflower, closing in late February 2013.

All The Way Through Evening was nominated for the Australian Film Critic's Association Award for Best Documentary of 2012, but ultimately lost to the Best Documentary Oscar Winner Searching For Sugar Man. All The Way Through Evening finally opened theatrically in New York City at the Village East Cinema, on 6 December 2013. It was invited to screen at The Library of Congress  in Washington, D.C. on 25 June 2014. Spong and the film's subject, Mimi Stern-Wolfe attended this screening.

In 2014, Rohan announced that he was working on the follow-up to All the Way Through Evening, entitled Winter At Westbeth. The film charts a year in the life of Westbeth Artists Community in New York City and profiles the lives of three ageing artists, including iconic Alvin Ailey and Martha Graham dancer Dudley Williams. It also features a brief appearance by All The Way Through Evening participant Mimi Stern-Wolfe.

The film had its world premiere at the 60th Sydney Film Festival in June 2016, before screening at the 65th Melbourne International Film Festival in August. The film then screened in competition at IFC Center as part of Doc NYC, where it received a Special Jury Mention, before a screening at The Library of Congress  in Washington, D.C. In November 2016. Spong and one of the film's participants, poet Ilsa Gilbert, attended this screening.

References

External links
Official Website

Australian film directors
Australian photographers
Living people
1981 births